The Bulgarian Women's Volleyball League is the most important Bulgarian women's volleyball competition organized by the Bulgarian Volleyball Federation (Българска Федерация Волейбол, БФВ), it was created in 1942.

History 
The Bulgaria National Women' s Volleyball League is organized by the Bulgarian Volleyball Federation. It has been held annually since its inception in 1942 and has changed its name over the years. The teams of CSKA, Levski, Maritsa (Plovdiv) have a traditional strong presence and performance. The national champion of Bulgaria with 2nd and third place represents the country in the European club volleyball competitions .

List of Champions

Table by club

See also
Bulgarian Men's Volleyball League

References

External links
Bulgarian Volleyball Federation
 Bulgarian League. women.volleybox.net 

Bulgaria
Sports leagues established in 1942
1942 establishments in Bulgaria
Volleyball in Bulgaria
Bulgarian League
Professional sports leagues in Bulgaria